Gresham is a surname.

Those bearing it include:
Diane Guthrie-Gresham (born 1971), Jamaican track and field athlete
Douglas Gresham (born 1945), British film producer
Gloria Gresham, American costume designer
Grits Gresham (1922–2008), American sportsman
James Gresham (disambiguation)
Jermaine Gresham (born 1988), American football player
Sir John Gresham (1495–1556), Lord Mayor of London and founder of Gresham's School
Joy Gresham (1915–1960), poet married to C. S. Lewis
Peter Gresham (born 1933), New Zealand politician
Sir Richard Gresham (1494–1549), merchant
Suzette Gresham, American chef
Sir Thomas Gresham (c. 1519 – 1579), after whom Gresham's Law is named, founder of Gresham College
Tony Gresham (born 1940), Australian amateur golfer
Walter Q. Gresham (1832–1895), American statesman and jurist
William Lindsay Gresham (1909–1962), American author
William Gresham, (1870 – after 1894), English footballer